KJCR (1240 AM) is a radio station licensed to Billings, Montana, United States. The station is currently owned by Agnus Dei Communications.

References

External links

FCC History Cards for KJCR

JCR
Radio stations established in 1946
1946 establishments in Montana
JCR